Cidade de Deus can refer to:
 Cidade de Deus, Rio de Janeiro, neighborhood in Rio de Janeiro, Brazil
 Cidade de Deus (Osasco), building complex in Osasco, São Paulo, Brazil
 City of God (Lins novel) (original title: Cidade de Deus), 1997 novel by Paulo Lins
 Cidade de Deus (film), 2002 Brazilian film by Fernando Meirelles and Kátia Lund, based on the above